Stuart Bradley Oliver (born 20 March 1972) was an Australian cricketer who played for the Tasmanian Tigers.

He attended the Australian Cricket Academy in 1990, and played both first-class and List "A" cricket for the Tigers from 1991, until 1996, but never managed to get a permanent spot in the side.

External links
 

1972 births
Living people
Tasmania cricketers
Australian cricketers
Cricketers from Launceston, Tasmania
20th-century Australian people